Tevfik is a Turkish given name for males corresponding to the Arabic Tawfik. People named Tevfik include:

 Tevfik Akbaşlı (born 1962), Turkish composer
 Tevfik Altındağ (born 1988), Turkish footballer
 Tevfik Başer (born 1951), Turkish-German film director and screenwriter
 Tevfik Esenç (1904–1992), last known speaker of the Ubykh language
 Tevfik Fikret (1867–1915), Turkish poet
 Tevfik Gelenbe (1931–2004), Turkish actor 
 Tevfik Köse (born 1988), Turkish footballer
 Tevfik Kış (born 1934), Turkish wrestler
 Tevfik Odabaşı (born 1981), Turkish wrestler
 Ahmet Tevfik Pasha (1845–1936), last Grand Vizier of the Ottoman Empire
Tofiq (Azerbajzani equivalent to Tevfik) Bahramov (1925-1993), Azerbajzani Referee

Turkish masculine given names